"Fool Hearted Memory" is a song written by Byron Hill and Blake Mevis, and recorded by American country music singer George Strait.  The song was Strait's first number 1 single (Billboard Magazine, 1982).  It was released in May 1982 as the first single from Strait's Strait from the Heart album, and was included in the soundtrack of the feature film The Soldier on Embassy Films. The song won an ASCAP Award for being among the most performed country songs of 1982.

Critical reception
Kevin John Coyne of Country Universe gave the song an A grade, saying that Strait "finds his literal voice" on this song. He states that it is "stronger and more confident than it had been on his first album. While the song calls for a certain amount of restraint and sadness, Strait is able to fully capture those emotions without sounding at all timid." He goes on to say that you cannot listen to the song without "reveling in the delightfully country fiddle riff that dominates the track."

Charts

Weekly charts

Year-end charts

References

1982 singles
1982 songs
George Strait songs
Songs written by Byron Hill
Songs written by Blake Mevis
MCA Records singles